Nicole Heesters  (born 14 February 1937) is a German actress. She was born in Potsdam and comes from a family of actors; her parents are Johannes Heesters, a Dutch-German actor, and Louise Ghijs, a Belgian stage actress. Her husband was film director Pit Fischer and one of her children, daughter Saskia Fischer, is also an actress. Nicole's older sister Wiesje (b. 1931) is a pianist in Vienna, Austria. Heesters lives in Hamburg.

Selected filmography 
 1954: Cabaret 
 1955: Three Men in the Snow
 1955:  Her First Date 
 1972: Alexander Zwo (TV miniseries)
 1981: 
 1982: Kamikaze 1989
 1989: The Play with Billions (TV film)
 1997:  (TV film)
 1998: Meschugge
 1999: Klemperer – Ein Leben in Deutschland (TV series)
 2000: Frauen lügen besser (TV film)
 2000: Für die Liebe ist es nie zu spät (TV film)
 2000: Deutschlandspiel (TV film), as Margaret Thatcher
 2001:  (TV film)
 2002: Der letzte Zeuge: Die Kugel im Lauf der Dinge (TV)
 2002: Donna Leon: Nobiltà (TV)
 2003: Treibjagd (TV film)
 2003: Rosamunde Pilcher: Gewissheit des Herzens (TV film)
 2007: Zeit zu leben (TV film)
 2007: Sehnsucht nach Rimini (TV film)
 2007: Copacabana (TV film)
 2008–2010: Der Kommissar und das Meer (TV series)
 2009: Fünf Tage Vollmond (TV film)
 2011: SOKO Donau: Todesengel (TV)
 2011: Ein Sommer in Paris (TV film)
 2012:  (TV film)
 2016: 
 2020: Breaking Even (TV series)

References

External links
Nicole Heesters on Kino.de (in German)

1937 births
Living people
German stage actresses
German people of Belgian descent
German people of Dutch descent
People from Potsdam